Paranoid Illusions is a single by German industrial music band X Marks the Pedwalk, the second from the album Human Desolation. It was released by Zoth Ommog in Europe as both an LP and CD.

Summary
Paranoid Illusions is the seventh single by X Marks the Pedwalk, and the second from the album Human Desolation.  It was the first X Marks the Pedwalk single not to be pressed on vinyl, and was released on CD by Zoth Ommog records with the catalogue number ZOT 28 CD.

Although the artwork for Paranoid Illusions closely resembles that of Human Desolation, André Schmechta has admitted to not liking it.

Track listing
 "Paranoid Illusions (Face Edit)" – 4:39
 "I See You (Extended)" – 5:08
 "Consciousness" – 2:52
 "Why?" – 3:58
 "Paranoid Illusions (Sky Mix)" – 7:29
 "I See You (Second View)" – 2:43

Personnel
Sevren Ni-arb (André Schmechta)
Raive Yarx (Thorsten Schmechta)

External links
Entry at official X Marks the Pedwalk website
Entry at Discogs.com

1993 singles
Industrial songs
X Marks the Pedwalk songs
1993 songs